Evil Lives Here is an American documentary television series on Investigation Discovery that debuted on January 17, 2016. This 60-minute true crime show spends each episode interviewing a family member of the highlighted murderer.

On August 23, 2020, Season 8 kicked off with a 90-minute episode called "I Killed Dirty John", on which Debra and Terra Newell recount their experiences with "Dirty" John Meehan. The format is featured on the Sequel series, Evil Lives Here: Shadows of Death, in which both investigators and families of victims discuss the impacts murders had on their lives. Unlike its predecessor, the culprit isn't revealed right away in some episodes.

Premise

The premise of the show depicts the stories of people who shared a home and a life with a loved one who would become a killer whether it be a parent, sibling, extended family member, or even an offspring. Reenactments blended with police footage, family photographs, videos and interviews give the audience a view of the murderer as told through the eyes of someone close to them.

Most episodes are done solo with only one close person to the suspect who committed heinous acts telling the story, though there are a few with two people featured. The producers are sometimes heard in the background asking questions to the person or persons being interviewed. Every episode depicts the person looking at pictures of themselves and or the suspect to reminisce on certain moments in their lives whether it be good or bad.

Episodes

Season 1 (2016)

Season 2 (2017)

Season 3 (2018)

Season 4 (2018)

Season 5 (2019)

Season 6 (2019)

Season 7 (2020)

Season 8 (2020)
Two specials aired during this season which are included at the end of the list. They are not included in the show's official episode count.

Season 9 (2021)

Season 10 (2021)

Season 11 (2022)

Season 12 (2022)

Season 13 (2023)

EpisodeNumber= 116
EpisodeNumber=6

Title He Looks Like The Killer On TV

Original Air Date 2023/03/05

Short Summary  Margie Bult comes to realize her husband, Paul Steven Mack, is a dangerous, ruthless murderer.

EpisodeNumber=117

EpisodeNumber=7

Title Fantasizing And Hunting

Original Air Date 2023/05//12

   Short Summary When Michael O'Leary moved in with his brother, Marc, he had no way of knowing  that his sibling was a serial rapist.

EpisodeNumber=118

EpisodeNumber=8

Title The Hole In The Backyard

Original Air Date 2023/03/19

Short Summary  Delilah and Mailine Yang endure the abuse inflicted upon them and their family by their mother Karina Her.  But is it possible the abuse also led to the murder of their stepfather Kou?

Evil Lives Here: Shadows of Death

A spinoff series titled Evil Lives Here: Shadows of Death debuted on October 29, 2020. Whereas the parent show Evil Lives Here showcases a person being interviewed on a family member who is a murderer and how the situation has affected them, this show features mostly the associates of the victims and law enforcement themselves being interviewed on how they were affected by the culprit's actions or culprits if there was more than one. 

As of 2021, the actors of the show must be vaccinated as a result of the COVID-19 pandemic.

Premise
Some episodes do favor the original show's format featuring family member culprits, but the stories are told by two or more people of the family (often joined by a police officer assigned to the case), as opposed to just one person the whole way through which is a main element of the original show for most of the episodes. With Shadows of Death, it is the reversal where solo interview storytelling is rare.

Episodes

Season 1 (2020)

Season 2 (2021)

Season 3 (2022)

Season 4 (2022)

References

External links

2010s American documentary television series
2016 American television series debuts
Investigation Discovery original programming
True crime television series